Maine Township is a township in Adams County, North Dakota, United States. As of the 2010 census, its population was 22.

References

Townships in Adams County, North Dakota
Townships in North Dakota